Komtessen is a 1961 Danish family film directed by Erik Overbye and starring Malene Schwartz.

Cast
 Malene Schwartz - Betina Mortensen
 Mimi Heinrich - Komtesse Maria Hardenborg
 Birgitte Federspiel - Gevinde Sonja Hardenborg
 Ebbe Langberg - Greve Flemming Hardenborg
 Emil Hass Christensen - Greve Otto Hardenborg
 Poul Reichhardt - Skovfoged Frank Jensen
 Henning Palner - Baron Torben
 Knud Hallest - Adolph Rytting
 Kjeld Jacobsen - Gartner Kresten Kyle
 Maria Garland - Forstanderinde Frk. Joransen
 Else-Marie - Jordemoder Willumsen
 Lily Broberg - Tjenestepigen Ragnhild
 Anne Werner Thomsen - Harriet
 Signi Grenness - Agnes Rytting
 Inge Ketti - Oda
 Else Hvidhøj - Frk. Iversen
 Bendt Rothe - Højesteretssagfører Skotterup
 Henry Nielsen - Landbetjent Henrik
 Hugo Herrestrup - Kadet'en
 Michael Flach - Harry Kyle
 Lili Heglund - Frk. Ravn
 Bent Bentzen - Ritmesteren
 Henry Lohmann - Chauffør Møller
 Ego Brønnum-Jacobsen - Monoklen
 Børge Møller Grimstrup - Hansen

References

External links

1961 films
Danish children's films
1960s Danish-language films
Films directed by Erik Overbye